Fulton is an unincorporated community in Farmers Creek Township, Jackson County, Iowa, United States.

History
 Fulton's population was 146 in 1902.

References

Unincorporated communities in Jackson County, Iowa
Unincorporated communities in Iowa